Colonel Marcellus Douglass was a Confederate Army officer and commander of the 13th Georgia Infantry Regiment during the American Civil War.

Douglass was born in Thomaston, Georgia, October 5, 1830. After graduation from the University of Georgia, he practiced law in Cuthbert, Georgia. On June 19, 1861, he was commissioned captain of Company E, 13th Georgia. He was promoted to Lt. Colonel July 8, 1861, and to full Colonel February 1, 1862. Douglass was killed at the battle of Antietam while commanding Lawton's brigade south of the section of the battle known as the Cornfield on September 17, 1862. Douglass was struck eight times before dying of his wounds commanding his men. He is buried in Rosedale Cemetery, Cuthbert.

References
 

Confederate States Army officers
People of Georgia (U.S. state) in the American Civil War
1862 deaths
1830 births
Confederate States of America military personnel killed in the American Civil War